Salmonsdam Nature Reserve is a nature reserve in the Overberg region of the Western Cape province of South Africa. It contains the mountain catchment area of the Paardensberg River in the Akkedisberg mountains.

History 
The area was declared a nature reserve by the Cape Provincial Administration in 1962.

Geography 
It encompasses the valley of the Paardensberg River and the surrounding mountain catchment area. The river flows from northeast to southwest, starting in a gorge called Keeromskloof and spreading out lower down into a marshy area known as "Die Weivlakte". Various smaller tributaries join the river; notably the Watervalkloof stream which passes over a series of small waterfalls called the "Zigzag Falls". On the eastern side of Keeromskloof can be found the Elandskrans Caves and Leopard Cave.

The Perdeberg peak on the northern edge of the park is  lower.

References

External links 
 Salmonsdam official website

Provincial nature reserves of the Western Cape
Nature reserves in South Africa
Protected areas established in 1962